Ambi is a 2006 Indian Kannada-language romantic film directed by V. Nagendra Prasad and produced by N. Kumar. The film stars Aditya and Manya in the lead roles. The film has musical score by V. Nagendra Prasad. The film ran for a hundred days.

Cast
Aditya as Ambi
Manya
Shobaraj
Kishore
Bullet Prakash
Chitra Shenoy
Shankar

Soundtrack
The music was composed by V. Nagendra Prasad.

Reception 
R. G. Vijayasarathy of Rediff opined that "This could have been a better film. Sadly, performance wise, Audithya has very little scope to prove his talent. A talented actress like Maanya is also wasted here. The result is mediocre fare". A critic from webindia123 said that "The tragedy of 'Ambi' is that it does not fall under any specific genre. You cannot call it a full-blooded action film or a family drama. It is not a comedy either. It is just a mixture of everything but none of them in the right proportions or right place". A critic from Viggy wrote that "It has nothing new to offer - be it the story nor the screenplay". A critic from Nowrunning stated that "Audithya's new film Ambi ends up as an average fare belying expectations of Kannada film fans and the film industry representatives".

References

External links
 

2006 films
Indian romantic drama films
2000s Kannada-language films
Films directed by V. Nagendra Prasad